= Weblo =

- Headquarters: Montreal
- Founder: Rocky Mirza
- Launched: September 2006; 20 years ago
- Current status: Defunct

Weblo was a website on which users were able to purchase and trade imaginary online ownership of states, countries, and individual street addresses. The website was accused of being a pyramid scheme.

== History ==
The website was launched in September 2006 by Rocky Mirza.

In 2006, the company filed a patent for "virtual property trading".

In July 2007, the company raised $3.3 million from VantagePoint Venture Partners.
